Prosody may refer to:

 Prosody (Sanskrit), the study of poetic meters and verse in Sanskrit and one of the six Vedangas, or limbs of Vedic studies
 Prosody (Greek), the theory and practice of Greek versification
 Prosody (Latin), the study of Latin versification and its laws of meter
 Prosody (linguistics), the suprasegmental characteristics of speech
 Prosody (music), the manner of setting words to music
 Prosody (software), a cross-platform XMPP server written in Lua
 Metre (poetry), the rhythmic structure of versed text

See also
 Arabic prosody, study of poetic meters in Arabic; sometimes called the Science of Poetry
 Semantic prosody, the way neutral words can be perceived as positive or negative
 Emotional prosody, perception of emotion in speech